Modern College of Arts, Science and Commerce (commonly Modern College), is an undergraduate and postgraduate college located in Shivajinagar, Pune. The college was established in the year 1970 and is affiliated with Savitribai Phule Pune University. Modern College was awarded Grade 'A+' in the third cycle of NAAC Accreditation.

It is awarded Savitribai Phule Pune University Best College by  SPPU Permanent Affiliation.

Modern College also provides the Skill Development Courses

Departments

Arts
English
Hindi
Marathi
Economics
Geography
German
History
Political Science
Psychology
Fashion Technology

Science

Computer Science
Electronics
Physics
Chemistry
Mathematics
Botany
Zoology
Microbiology
Biotechnology
Statistics
Information Technology

Commerce

 Aided
 Self-financed

B.Voc 

 Food Processing Technology
 Green House Technology
Salient Features
Affiliated to Savitribai Phule Pune University
"College with Potential for Excellence status (CPE)" by UGC
Re-accredited by NAAC with Grade "A".
"Best College Award " by SPPU
"NSS Best College Award"  by SPPU
"Sports Best College Award" by SPPU
"Star College Scheme" by DBT Government of India.

Community Scheme by UGC
Digital Library
Virtual Classroom
Digital Classroom
Virtual Laboratory
Digital Record Room
Center for Promotion of Research
Center for Teaching, Learning and Evaluation

References

External links
http://moderncollegepune.edu.in

Universities and colleges in Pune
Educational institutions established in 1970
1970 establishments in Maharashtra